Quoddy can mean the following places:

Canada
 East Quoddy, Nova Scotia
 West Quoddy, Nova Scotia

United States
Quoddy Head State Park in Maine
West Quoddy Head Light in Maine